The 1967 National Challenge Cup was the 54th annual national open soccer championship held by the United States Soccer Football Association. The tournament was won by Greek American Atlas of New York City.

Bracket

Final

External links 
 US Open Cup 1967

Lamar Hunt U.S. Open Cup
U.S. Open Cup